Zambaulim is a village in South Goa, Goa.

In the 1800s, it was the regional capital for the colonial Provincias de Zamboulim (also called Panchemal), which was formed by merger of 5 surrounding districts of:
Embarbacem,
Chandrovadi,
Balli,
Astagrar,
Cacora

Geography
It is located at an elevation of 39 m above MSL.

Location
Nearest railway station is at Margao.

Places of interest
 Shri Damodar Temple

References

External links
 About Zambaulim

Villages in South Goa district